The 2007 season was the first season of the Intercity Football League in Taiwan. Eight teams were scheduled to compete in the 2007 league season, but Kaohsiung County withdrew before the league's opening. The seven remaining teams were Taipei City (represented by Tatung F.C.), Taipei County, Tainan City, Tainan County, Chiayi County (sponsored by Le Beau Max Resort), Kaohsiung City, and Yilan County.

First phase

Table

Fixtures

Second phase

Awards
 Golden Boot  Lo Chih-en (Yilan County)
 Golden Ball  Tsai Hui-kai (Taipei City)
 Best Manager  Chiang Mu-tsai (Taipei City)
 Fair Play Award Taipei City (Tatung F.C.)
 Best XI
 Goalkeeper:  Hsu Jen-feng (Taipei City)
 Defenders:  Chang Yung-hsien (Taipei City),  Chang Wu-yeh (Tainan County), Chang Kai-hsian (Taipei County),  Chen Jeng-i (Taipei City)
 Midfielders:  Tseng Tai-lin (Taipei City),  Tsai Hui-kai (Taipei City),  Lin Kuei-pin (Taipei City),  Lo Chih-an (Yilan County)
 Forwards:  Chang Han (Tainan County),  Huang Wei-yi (Yilan County)

References

2007
1
Taipei